Billy Jefferson (born March 17, 1918) is a former American football running back in the National Football League.

References

1918 births
Players of American football from Mississippi
American football running backs
1974 deaths
People from Clay County, Mississippi
Mississippi State Bulldogs football players
Brooklyn Dodgers (NFL) players
Philadelphia Eagles players
Detroit Lions players